The 2003 Bolsover District Council election took place on 1 May 2003 to elect members of Bolsover District Council in Derbyshire, England. The whole council was up for election after boundary changes and the Labour party stayed in overall control of the council.

Election result
Labour won 31 of the 37 seats on the council to keep a 25-seat majority on the council. Of the other 6 seats, 4 were won by independents, while the remaining 2 seats were taken by the Whitwell Residents Association, which won both seats in Whitwell ward. Overall turnout at the election was about 30%, reaching a high of 42.4% in Elmton-with-Creswell.

Ward results

References

2003
2003 English local elections
2000s in Derbyshire